Jinn, or genies, are supernatural beings in Arab folklore and Islamic teachings.

Jinn may also refer to:

 Jin dynasty (1115–1234), sometimes written as Jinn to distinguish from the earlier Jin Dynasty (266–420) verse 
 Al-Jinn or The Jinn, the 72nd chapter of the Quran

Entertainment
 Jinn (band), a Japanese band
 Jinn (TV series), a 2019 Netflix TV series
 Jinn (2014 film), a film from Exxodus Pictures
Jinn (2018 film), a 2018 film by Nijla Mu'min
 Jinn: A Novel, a 2004 book by Matthew B. J. Delaney
 Qui-Gon Jinn, a character in the Star Wars universe
Jinn, a character in Pierre Boulle's 1963 science fiction novel La Planète des singes
 "Jinn", a song by Northlane from the 2019 album Alien

See also
 Djinn (disambiguation)
 Genie (disambiguation)
 Jin (disambiguation)
 Jinnī (disambiguation)